Brian Nelson may refer to: 

Brian Nelson (screenwriter) (born 1964), American screenwriter and producer 
Brian Nelson (Northern Irish loyalist) (1947–2003), chief of intelligence for the Ulster Defence Association
Brian Nelson (literature professor) (born 1946), literature professor, author and translator of French literature
Brian E. Nelson, lawyer and government official

See also
Bryan Nelson (born 1958), member of the Florida House of Representatives
Bryan Nelson (ornithologist) (1932–2015), British ornithologist and academic